Moira Brooker (born 1957) is an English actress and presenter. She is best known for playing Judith Hanson in the long-running British sitcom As Time Goes By. The program lasted for nine series between 1992 and 2005, and is still broadcast on some PBS affiliate stations in the United States.

Biography
Brooker was born in Croydon, and is the daughter of Victor Brooker and Ethel Bassett; she has an older sister, Janis. In 1983, Brooker appeared in the television series Agatha Christie's Partners in Crime, appearing in the sixth episode "The Ambassador's Boots". In 1984, she appeared in a play called Canterbury Tales, which was adapted from Geoffrey Chaucer's book of the same name by Phil Woods and director Michael Bogdanov.

In 1992, she joined the cast of As Time Goes By, which starred Judi Dench and Geoffrey Palmer. Brooker played Judith Hanson, the twice-divorced daughter who runs a secretarial agency with her mother, Jean Pargetter (played by Dench). Later in the series, Judith married Alistair Deacon (played by Philip Bretherton). In 1995, Brooker appeared in the BBC1 miniseries Ghosts, appearing in the second episode "Blood and Water" as Angela McClean, a woman unnaturally close to her brother. In early 2010, Brooker and actress Jenny Funnell (who played Sandy in As Time Goes By) were both flown into New York City to appear in WNET's and other PBS stations' pledge drives.

Brooker married actor Anthony Milner in 1985 and has two children. Milner died in July 2015.

References

External links
 

1957 births
Living people
20th-century English actresses
21st-century English actresses
Actresses from London
English television actresses
People from Croydon